Class 78 may refer to:

 DRG Class 78, a German 4-6-4T tank locomotive class operated by the Deutsche Reichsbahn and Deutsche Bundesbahn comprising:
 Class 78.0-5: Prussian T 18, Württemberg T 18
 Class 78.6: BBÖ 729
 DB Class 78.10: DB rebuild from the DRG Class 38.10-40